Nilradical may refer to:
Nilradical of a ring
Nilradical of a Lie algebra